Lu Zhen (957–1014), courtesy name Zifa, was a Song dynasty scholar-official, historian, poet and diplomat. He was famous for his writings, including Jiu Guo Zhi, a history book on the Five Dynasties period.

Biography
Lu Zhen was a great-grandson of the Tang dynasty grand councilor Lu Yan. In the early 940s, his father Lu Xunmei served as an aide to the Chu governor Ma Xigao in Lian Prefecture (in modern Guangdong). Lu Zhen was born in 957 in Qiyang in Yong Prefecture (in modern Hunan), then ruled by the warlord Zhou Xingfeng; in 963 this domain would be incorporated into the Song dynasty territory. Before he was five Lu Zhen could already read Confucian Classics such as Classic of Filial Piety and Analects. When he was 11 his father died, leaving the family destitute, but his strict mother made sure he focused on his studies every day no matter the season.

In 992 Lu Zhen passed the imperial examination. However, Emperor Taizong felt the exam was too easy and did not adequately cover ancient philosophical classics, so he gave the graduates another test question: compose a fu on "Zhiyan Richu" (卮言日出; "Goblet Words Appear Daily"), an expression found in the Zhuangzi. Most of the hundreds of graduates could not remember the quote, but the studious Lu Zhen was the exception. His composition, which skillfully contained numerous classical references, was well-liked by the emperor. Lu Zhen's official career began as a case reviewer in the Court of Judicial Review, Vice-Prefect of Bin Prefecture (in modern Shaanxi), and later Vice-Prefect of Xu Prefecture (in modern Jiangsu). He later returned to the capital Kaifeng to work in the Historiography Institute with a concurrent appointment of "Companion for the Heir Apparent".

In late 1000, he was serving as the Prefect of Bin Prefecture (in modern Shandong, a different prefecture than the one he stationed earlier), when the Khitan-ruled Liao dynasty invaded from the north. One day, the Liao forces arrived outside the city gate, and locals began to panic. Some began to cry, knowing that Lu Zhen had no military experience. Lu Zhen comforted the people, and told them he would focus on the city's defense and not actively engage the much stronger enemy. After a few days, the Liao army withdrew. Liu Zong, the fiscal commissioner of Hebei Circuit, praised Lu Zhen in a report to Emperor Zhenzong.

After he was recalled to the capital, Lu Zhen served as a judge in the Court of Judicial review and an aide in the Court of Imperial Sacrifices before serving as Prefects first in Hezhong Prefecture (in modern Shanxi) and later in Deng Prefecture (in modern Henan). Some time between 1004 and 1007 he served as Pacifícation Commissioner of Fujian Circuit. In 1009 he was sent to the Liao dynasty on a diplomatic mission; his experiences were recorded as "Cheng Yao Lu" (乘軺錄, "An Account of Riding the Carriage").

Lu Zhen was an alcoholic and died in late 1014 from an illness. During his later years he wrote the Jiu Guo Zhi, a history book on the Five Dynasties and Ten Kingdoms period, but he died before he could finish it. His son Lu Lun, who became a Master of Ceremonies in the Court of Imperial Sacrifices upon his death, added 2 chapters to the book.

Poetry
The 18th-century collection Recorded Occasions of Song Poetry includes 3 poems by Lu Zhen:
"A Gift to Wu Bin, Recorder of Anyi County, for His Retirement"
"Writing on the Wall of Master Huiquan"
"Hacking Brambles"

Notes and references

11th-century Chinese historians
People from Qiyang County
950s births
1014 deaths
Song dynasty diplomats
Song dynasty historians
Song dynasty poets
Writers from Hunan
Historians from Hunan
Poets from Hunan
11th-century Chinese poets